Kang Yong-gyun (born July 23, 1974) is a North Korean wrestler who competed in the Men's Graeco-Roman 54 kg at the 2000 Summer Olympics and won the bronze medal.  He finished 4th at the 1996 Summer Olympics at 48 kg.  He was two-time gold medallist at the World Military Games and two-time silver medallist at the 1998 and 2002 Asian Games.

References

 

1974 births
Living people
Olympic wrestlers of North Korea
Wrestlers at the 1996 Summer Olympics
Wrestlers at the 2000 Summer Olympics
North Korean male sport wrestlers
Olympic bronze medalists for North Korea
Olympic medalists in wrestling
Medalists at the 2000 Summer Olympics
Asian Games medalists in wrestling
Wrestlers at the 1998 Asian Games
Wrestlers at the 2002 Asian Games
Asian Games silver medalists for North Korea

Medalists at the 1998 Asian Games
Medalists at the 2002 Asian Games
20th-century North Korean people
21st-century North Korean people